Fort Hope is a musical group from the United Kingdom.

Fort Hope may also refer to:

Fort Hope, Ontario, an Ojibwe First Nations band government in Kenora District, Ontario, Canada
Fort Hope Airport
Fort Hope, the original outpost of Hudson Bay Company at Hope, British Columbia, Canada
"Fort Hope", a 1993 episode of Space Rangers

See also
Fort Good Hope, Northwest Territories, Canada
House of Hope (fort), a Dutch settlement in what is now Hartford, Connecticut